APPRO may refer to:

Afghanistan Public Policy Research Organization
Appro International, Inc.